Balurghat College is a co-educational institution of higher education located in Balurghat,  Dakshin Dinajpur district, West Bengal, India.

History
The college was established in June 1948 as an intermediate liberal arts college with 96 students. In 1950, the college was recognized by the University Grants Commission and it is supported by the West Bengal government as an aided college. North Bengal University accepted the college as a constituent college in September 2003; it is now under Gour Banga University.

About college
Today, the college has grown into a degree college with over 3,000 students, with undergraduate education in arts, sciences and commerce, and postgraduate courses in Bengali and commerce.

Distance education is offered through North Bengal University, and the college is a study centre for Netaji Subhas Open University and Indira Gandhi National Open University.

English and Bengali  are compulsory languages for all undergraduate students at Balurghat College.

Accreditation
Balurghat College  was accredited by the National Assessment and Accreditation Council (NAAC) in May 2004 with a grade of "B".

Campus
The campus occupies  in Balurghat and is equipped with facilities including a library, laboratories, museum, hostel, workshop and guest house.

Museum
Balurghat College Museum is a new addition to the campus, with an extensive collection of early stone sculptures of the Pala-Sena period, coins and 11th century stone inscriptions of Nayapala from the town of Gangarampur.

See also

References

External links
Balurghat College
University of Gour Banga
University Grants Commission
National Assessment and Accreditation Council

Colleges affiliated to University of Gour Banga
Educational institutions established in 1948
Academic institutions formerly affiliated with the University of North Bengal
Universities and colleges in Dakshin Dinajpur district
1948 establishments in West Bengal
Balurghat